Antonio Tirol Carpio (born October 26, 1949) is a former associate justice of the Supreme Court of the Philippines. He was sworn in as member of the High Court by President Gloria Macapagal Arroyo on October 26, 2001, and served until his retirement on October 26, 2019. He served as Associate Justice of the Supreme Court of the Philippines for a period of eighteen (18) years. He also served as chief justice in an acting capacity at least three separate times during his tenure as Senior Associate Justice.

Profile 
Born in Davao City to Bernardo Dumlao Carpio and Sol Gonzales Tirol, Carpio finished his elementary and secondary education at the Ateneo de Davao University. He obtained his undergraduate degree in Economics from the Ateneo de Manila University in 1970 and his law degree from the University of the Philippines College of Law at UP Diliman where he graduated valedictorian and cum laude in 1975. He ranked sixth with a rating of 85.70% in the 1975 Philippine Bar Examination.

After law school, Carpio went into private practice and founded the Carpio Villaraza and Cruz law firm. He soon emerged as one of the more prominent and successful legal practitioners in the country. Carpio also taught tax law, corporate law, and negotiable instruments law at the UP College of Law from 1983 to 1992.

In 1992, he joined the administration of President Fidel Ramos as chief presidential legal counsel of the Office of the President. As such, he worked for major reforms in telecommunications, shipping, civil aviation, and insurance industries. During the presidency of Joseph Estrada, Carpio returned to private practice and penned a regular opinion column published in the Philippine Daily Inquirer.

Carpio was the first appointee of President Gloria Macapagal Arroyo to the Supreme Court of the Philippines after her assumption into office in January 2001. At the age of 52, he was one of the youngest appointees to the High Court.

Carpio received the Presidential Medal of Merit from President Fidel Ramos in 1998 for his "distinguished and exemplary service" to the country, the Outstanding Achievement in Law Award from the Ateneo de Manila Alumni Association, and an honorary Doctorate of Laws from the Ateneo de Davao University. The University of the Philippines Alumni Association named him Outstanding U.P. Alumni in Public International Law in 2015 and the Most Distinguished Alumni in 2017.

Being the senior associate justice, he assumed the post of acting chief justice on May 29, 2012, until the president appointed a new chief justice. He assumed the post after his predecessor, Renato Corona, was convicted by the Senate impeachment court for his failure to disclose in his Statement of Assets, Liabilities, and Net Worth, dollar accounts that led to his removal in office, a penalty authorized by the 1987 Constitution. He assumed the post again on March 1, 2018, as Chief Justice Maria Lourdes Sereno filed an indefinite leave in the midst of impeachment proceedings against her.

Carpio chaired the court's Second Division and the Senate Electoral Tribunal. He also headed the High Court's Committee on the Revision of the Rules of Court.

South China Sea dispute 

Carpio's personal advocacy is "to protect and preserve Philippine territorial and maritime sovereignty specifically in the West Philippine Sea." referring to an area of the South China Sea claimed by the Philippines.

He believes in the importance of "an understanding by citizens of all claimant states...either to restrain extreme nationalism fueled by historical lies or to give hope to a just and durable settlement of the dispute based not only on the United Nations Convention on the Law of the Sea (UNCLOS) but also on respect for actual historical facts."

In his speech 'Grand Theft of the Global Commons', Carpio called "...the fishery Regulations of Hainan a grand theft of the global commons in the South China Sea." He also maintains that "The Philippines is fighting a legal battle not only for itself but also for all mankind. A victory for the Philippines is a victory for all States, coastal and landlocked, that China has shut out of the global commons in the South China Sea."

In 2015, the Philippine Department of Foreign Affairs sponsored Carpio on a world lecture tour on the South China Sea dispute. Carpio presented the Philippines' historical and legal case on the dispute before think tanks and universities in 30 cities covering 17 countries.

In May 2017, Carpio published an eBook titled "The South China Sea Dispute: Philippine Sovereign Rights and Jurisdiction in the West Philippine Sea". The book collects over 140 lectures and speeches by Carpio "intended to convince the Chinese people that the nine-dashed line has no legal or historical basis." The eBook "explains in layman’s language the South China Sea dispute from A to Z."

Notable opinions 
https://web.archive.org/web/20150614081333/http://sc.judiciary.gov.ph/jurisprudence/2003/jan2003/135306_carpio.htm MVRS Publications v. Islamic Da'Wah Counccriminal libel and libel as a tort (joined by J. Panganiban)
 Estrada v. Escritor  — Dissenting opinion — on right of free exercise of religion as shield from administrative sanction for bigamous relations (joined by J. Panganiban, Callejo Sr., and Carpio-Morales)
 Feliciano v. COA (2004) – on legal personality of local water districts
 Tenebro v. CA (2004) – Dissenting — on whether the annulment of the second marriage affects criminal liability for bigamy (joined by J. Quisumbing, Austria-Martinez, Carpio-Morales, and Tinga)
 Central Bank Employees v. BSP (2004) – Dissenting — on claims for wage increases of government employees in accordance with equal protection clause even absent enabling legislation
 Sonza v. ABS-CBN (2004) – on employment relationship between a television presenter and the television network
 MIAA v. City of Parañaque (2006) — on exemption of government agencies in payment of local government taxes
 Rufino v. Endriga (2006) — on presidential appointing power over officials of government agencies established by Congress
 Lambino v. COMELEC (2006) — on People's Initiative as a mode to amend the Constitution
 Romulo L. Neri Vs. Senate Committee(2008) – Dissenting and Concurring Opinion, on The limits of executive privilege
  Administrative Matter No. 07-09-13-SC (2008)- Dissenting Opinion— on contempt charge versus Amado A.P. Macasaet, a newspaper columnist imputing bribery to a member of the Supreme Court
 Araullo v. Aquino (2014)- Separate Opinion —  on the constitutionality of the Disbursement Acceleration Program (DAP)
 Poe-Llamanzares v. COMELEC (2016)- Dissenting Opinion —  on the disqualification case of Mrs. Llamanzares to run for President of the Republic of the Philippines
Soriano v. MTRCB - dissenting opinion

References

External links 
 Senior Associate Justice Antonio T. Carpio (Official Supreme Court Webpage)
 Speech as Acting Chief Justice: Judicial Reform too important to fail
 Carpio acts as Chief Justice
 for Chief Justice

|-

|-

|-

|-

|-

|-

1949 births
Associate Justices of the Supreme Court of the Philippines
Ateneo de Davao University alumni
Ateneo de Manila University alumni
20th-century Filipino lawyers
Living people
People from Davao City
Philippine Daily Inquirer people
Ramos administration personnel
University of the Philippines Diliman alumni
Visayan people
21st-century Filipino judges